Arhal is a village in Shimla district in the Indian state of Himachal Pradesh.
On 1–3 January 2016, there was the celebration of the festival Shaant Maha Yagya of Devi jaga mata of Arhal which came after 47 years.
The valley of Arhal is known for its natural environment and sites.

The panchayat of three villages Batari, kanda and Arhal is called Arhal panchyat. There are about 2500 voters in Arhal panchyat. It is second biggest panchayats of the tehsil Rohru.

References

Villages in Shimla district